Russell Hogg (1 July 1968 – 17 September 2012) was a Scottish badminton player. He reached a career high as world number 8 and has a number of titles to his name. Hogg competed at the 1994, 1998 and 2002 Commonwealth Games, and won a mixed team bronze in 2002.

About 
Dunfermline-born Hogg started playing badminton with the age 10. His father Harry Hogg was the Defence of Ministry worker. Hogg spent two years in Mauritius and after that he studied in St Leonard's Primary, Dunfermline, where his mother Moira was a teacher. It was his father, also a badminton coach, who introduced him to the sport. Hogg was exceptionally hard-working, developing his game at Alloa Badminton Club to win European gold medal in the under-14 category. Although he played badminton, he was an enthusiastic cricket player too. He had represented Scotland's under-16s and served as captain of Fife County Cricket Club for a season. Hogg finally found his way into the badminton and began developing his game to be the country's elite doubles player. He won Scottish national junior championships for 5 times. He left school around 1986 to work in administration with the Ministry of Defence at Rosyth Dockyard and it was the same time that he made his Scotland debut. Between 1988 and 2002 he won the National men's doubles championships for 10 times, eight of them with Kenny Middlemiss. He also won the mixed doubles title twice with Kirsteen McEwan. On the world tournament circuit he reached a career best of No. 8 in mixed doubles and No. 17 in men's doubles. After retiring from playing career he worked for North Ayrshire Leisure as badminton development manager before joining the Badminton Scotland staff in November 2004 as national development manager. His wife Julie Hogg whom he met while he was 12 was also the badminton player. Hogg was third most-capped player in the country, with 117 appearances, and had the hands-on experience that also made him a respected coach and mentor. He mentored the Scottish team in the 2012 Olympic Games. Hogg died on 17 September 2012, aged 44, due to skin cancer.

Achievements

IBF International 
Men's doubles

Mixed doubles

References

External links 

1968 births
2012 deaths
Sportspeople from Dunfermline
Scottish male badminton players
Badminton players at the 1994 Commonwealth Games
Badminton players at the 1998 Commonwealth Games
Badminton players at the 2002 Commonwealth Games
Commonwealth Games bronze medallists for Scotland
Commonwealth Games medallists in badminton
Medallists at the 2002 Commonwealth Games